The West Siberian lemming or Western Siberian brown lemming (Lemmus sibiricus) is a true lemming species found in the Russian Federation. Like other lemmings, it belongs to the Cricetidae family of rodents.  

It is endemic to Russia, where it has a wide range throughout Siberia, from the region just south of the White Sea east all the way to the Verkhoyansk Range, which serves as a barrier between it and the East Siberian lemming (L. paulus), which was formerly considered conspecific with it. 

An insular population inhabits Novaya Zemlya; a 2021 study which performed genetic analysis on the mtDNA of the Novaya Zemlya population found them to group with the Norway lemming (L. lemmus) despite their similar appearance to mainland L. sibiricus, and classified them as the subspecies L. l. chernovi, or Novaya Zemlya lemming. However, the American Society of Mammalogists rejected these results pending further evidence, stating that these more likely represented L. sibiricus with ancient mitochondrial introgression from L. lemmus (see the article for L. lemmus for further info).

It does not hibernate during winter; it lives in burrows.  It is prey to several animals, including the snowy owl and the Arctic fox. As with other species of lemmings, Siberian browns routinely experience large-scale fluctuations in their population sizes.

References

Further reading
Musser, G. G. and M. D. Carleton. (2005). Superfamily Muroidea. pp. 894–1531 in Mammal Species of the World a Taxonomic and Geographic Reference. D. E. Wilson and D. M. Reeder eds. Johns Hopkins University Press, Baltimore.

Lemmus
Mammals described in 1792
Arctic land animals
Mammals of the Arctic
Mammals of Siberia
Endemic fauna of Russia
Taxonomy articles created by Polbot